Norton may refer to:

Places
Norton, meaning 'north settlement' in Old English, is a common place name. Places named Norton include:

Canada
Rural Municipality of Norton No. 69, Saskatchewan
Norton Parish, New Brunswick
Norton, New Brunswick, a village

United Kingdom

England
Norton, Runcorn, Cheshire, a district
Norton, South Hams, a location in Devon
Norton, Torridge, a location in Devon
Norton, County Durham, an area of Stockton-on-Tees
Norton, East Sussex, a location
Norton, Gloucestershire, a civil parish
Norton, Hampshire, a hamlet near Sutton Scotney
Norton, Herefordshire, a civil parish near Bromyard
Norton, Hertfordshire, a village
Norton, Isle of Wight, a location
Norton, Kent
Norton, Northamptonshire, a village
Norton, Nottinghamshire, a village
Norton, Culmington, a location in Shropshire
Norton, Stockton, Shropshire, a location in Shropshire
Norton, Wroxeter and Uppington, a location in Shropshire
Norton, Somerset, a location
Norton, Doncaster, South Yorkshire, a civil parish
Norton, Sheffield, South Yorkshire, a district
Norton, Suffolk, a village
Norton, Dudley, West Midlands, a suburb and council ward in the town of Stourbridge
Norton, Arun, a location in West Sussex
Norton, Chichester, a location in West Sussex
Norton, Wiltshire, a civil parish
Norton, Worcestershire, a village near Worcester
Norton, east Worcestershire, a location near Evesham, Worcestershire
Norton, Buckland and Stone, Kent, a civil parish
Norton Camp, a Bronze Age hill fort in Somerset
Norton in Hales, a village and parish in Shropshire
Norton-in-the-Moors, an area of Stoke-on-Trent, Staffordshire
Norton Juxta Twycross, a village in Leicestershire
Norton-le-Clay, a village and parish in North Yorkshire
Norton-on-Derwent, a town and parish in North Yorkshire
Norton Rural District (Yorkshire), a former local government area
Norton St Philip, civil parish in Somerset
Norton-sub-Hamdon, Somerset, a civil parish
Chipping Norton, West Oxfordshire, a civil parish
King's Norton, Birmingham, a town
King's Norton, Leicestershire, a village and civil parish
Wood Norton, Norfolk, a village and civil parish

Wales
Norton, Monmouthshire, a location
Norton, Powys, a village
Norton, Swansea, a settlement in Mumbles
Norton, Penrice, a location in Swansea

United States
Norton, Arizona, a populated place
Norton, Indiana, an unincorporated community
Norton County, Kansas
Norton, Kansas, a city and the county seat
Nortonville, Kentucky, originally established as Norton
Norton, Massachusetts, a town
Norton, Missouri, an unincorporated community
Norton, New Jersey, an unincorporated community
Norton, Ohio, a city
Norton, Texas, an unincorporated community
Norton, Vermont, a town
Norton, Virginia, a city
Norton, West Virginia, an unincorporated community
Norton, Wisconsin, an unincorporated community
Norton, Yolo County, California, an unincorporated community
Norton Air Force Base, California
Norton Bay, Alaska
Norton Reservoir, Massachusetts
Norton Sound, Alaska, an inlet of the Bering Sea
Norton Township (disambiguation)

Elsewhere
Norton, Sri Lanka, a village
Norton, Zimbabwe, a town
Norton Street, Leichhardt, Sydney, New South Wales, Australia
Chipping Norton, New South Wales, Sydney, Australia
Norton Summit, South Australia, in the Adelaide Hills

People and fictional characters
Norton (given name)
Norton (surname)

Music
Norton (band), indie rock band from Portugal
Norton Records, a record label

Brands and enterprises
Norton (Symantec), the computer security division of Symantec
Norton Abrasives
Norton Healthcare, a healthcare system in Louisville, Kentucky
Norton Motorcycle Company, a British motorcycle manufacturer
W. W. Norton & Company, an American book publishing corporation

Titles
Baron Norton, a title in the Peerage of the United Kingdom
Norton baronets, four titles, all extinct

Other uses
Norton (grape), a variety of grape also known as Cynthiana
Norton tradition, an archaeological culture from the North American Arctic
Norton's theorem in electronics
Norton's Star Atlas, a set of 16 celestial charts

See also
Naughton
Norton House (disambiguation), various buildings
Nortonville (disambiguation)